The Queen's Gaels (also known as the Queen's Golden Gaels) is the Athletics program representing Queen's University at Kingston in Kingston, Ontario, Canada. Team colours are blue, red, and gold. The main athletics facilities include Richardson Memorial Stadium, the Queen's Athletics and Recreation Centre, Nixon Field and Tindall Field.

Queen's teams have had a variety of successes both provincially and nationally. Their most recent U SPORTS National Championship was awarded to the Women's Rugby program, who hoisted the Monilex Trophy on home soil at Nixon Field in 2021.

The Gaels football team is one of the oldest and most successful in Canada, including three straight Grey Cup victories in 1922, 1923, and 1924 and four Vanier Cup victories in 1968, 1978, 1992, and 2009. Queen's University hockey teams have competed on three occasions as Stanley Cup finalists in 1895, 1899, and 1906.

The Gaels have also won the 2010–11 U Sports Men's Curling Championship and the women's soccer team has won the national championship in 1988, 2010, and 2011.

The fight song is known as Oil Thigh which was written in 1891 and features Gaelic lyrics which can be heard at many sporting events. The mascot is Boo Hoo the Bear.

Name
Prior to 1947, Queen's teams were commonly referred to as "The Tricolour."

The "Golden Gaels" name was coined in 1947 by Kingston Whig-Standard sports reporter Cliff Bowering, after the football team traded its traditional uniform of red, gold, and blue bands for gold jerseys, gold helmets, and red pants. The name caught on and became the familiar term for Queen's teams by the 1950s. "Gaels" is a reference to Queen's Scottish heritage (Queen's University was established in 1841 by the Presbyterian church). 

In September 2008, Queen's Athletics & Recreation Department began referring to the school's teams as "Queen's Gaels." Along with this change, the website was changed from goldengaels.com to gogaelsgo.com. The change was reportedly made to highlight the university's name in promoting the team, however some have criticized the move as "change for the sake of change." Under media scrutiny, the department claimed it had not in fact officially changed the name of the team; thus, major media sources like the Kingston Whig-Standard and CKWS-TV continue to refer to the team as the "Golden Gaels".

Varsity Teams

Basketball
Men's

Queen's hosted McGill University at the Kingston YMCA on February 6, 1904, in the first-ever Canadian interuniversity basketball game. McGill won 9–7, after a ten-minute overtime period to break a 7–7 tie. The Queen's Men's Basketball program attended their first ever U SPORTS National Championship in 2022 after upsetting the undefeated Carleton Ravens in the OUA Semi-final.

Women's

The Queen's Gaels Women's Basketball program had their strongest finish ever in 2021-22, placing third at the U SPORTS Final 8 tournament which took place at the Athletics & Recreation Centre on Queen's Campus.

Cross Country 
The Queen's Gaels have a Men's and Women's Cross Country and Distance Track program which continually ranks highly on the national rankings. In 2021-22, the Gaels ranked 6th in the country for the Men's program and 8th in the country for the Women's program.

Football 

The Queen's Gaels football program is one of the longest-lived and storied in U Sports. The team began organized play in 1883 when the Ontario Rugby Football Union was first founded and won ORFU champions in 1893 and 1894. Queen's has competed continuously since 1882, celebrating its 125th anniversary in 2007. The first organized university football league in Canada, the Canadian Intercollegiate Rugby Football Union (CIRFU), was founded in Kingston in November, 1897, with charter members Queen's, McGill University, and the University of Toronto., the football squad showed continued success, winning three straight Grey Cups in 1922, 1923 and 1924. Once teams stopped competing for the Grey Cup, which was begun being solely awarded to teams in the professional Canadian Football League in 1955, the Gaels turned their attention to the Vanier Cup, appearing in the U Sports championship game five times and winning four of those games in 1968, 1978, 1992 and 2009.

Ice hockey

Men's
In 1886, Queen's challenged the Royal Military College of Canada to a game played on the frozen Kingston harbour; the two schools play annually for the Carr-Harris Cup, to continue the world's oldest hockey rivalry. Queen's hockey is one of the oldest hockey clubs in the world; only McGill University's team, started in 1875, is older among Canadian university teams. Queen's played its first season in 1883-84, with the first game for which records exist played against a team from Petawawa.

In the 1890s, Queen's played in the Ontario Hockey Association (OHA), winning its championship three times consecutively, taking the Cosby Cup into its permanent possession. Queen's won the inaugural J. Ross Robertson Cup during the 1898–99 season, as the senior ice hockey champion of the OHA. As Ontario champion, the Queen's hockey team was a regular in Stanley Cup Challenge Games by challenging in 1895, 1899 and 1906.

Queen's donated the Queen's Cup for annual Ontario University Athletics competition in 1898. In 1902, the Intercollegiate Hockey Union was formed and the Gaels won the title in 1904 and 1906. In 1909, Queen's won the Intercollegiate league and then won the Allan Cup national championship by defeating the Ottawa Cliffsides in a challenge. The 1910 team won the Allan Cup for a second time by winning the Intercollegiate title and a challenge before losing the Cup in a second challenge to Toronto St. Michael's.

Queen's operated a junior ice hockey team during the 1920s in the OHA. The junior team won the J. Ross Robertson Cup as the provincial champions in 1926, and had been finalists in 1921. Queen's reached the 1926 Memorial Cup finals, but lost to the Calgary Canadians for the national championship.

The varsity teams play at the Kingston Memorial Centre following the demolition of the Jock Harty Arena.

In 2018-19, the Gaels won their first Queen's Cup in 38 years, 4-1 over Guelph Gryphons in front of a 2,900 people at the Kingston Memorial Centre

Regular season results

Playoff results
1999-2000 Defeated Toronto Varsity Blues in first round, 2 games to 1.
Down 4-1 heading into the 3rd period of game 3. Scored 3 goals in 82 seconds to tie the game and another 74 secs later to take the lead. Won the game 6-4 with an empty net goal.
 Defeated Guelph Gryphons in quarter-final, 2 games to 0.
 Lost to UQTR in OUA Final Four, semi-final, 3-2.
2000-2001 Lost to RMC Paladins in first round 2 games to 0
2001-2002 Out of Playoffs
2002-2003 Defeated RMC Paladins in first round 2 games to 0
 Lost to Toronto Varsity Blues in quarter-final 2 games to 1
2003-2004 Defeated RMC Paladins in first round 2 games to 0
 Lost to Toronto Varsity Blues in quarter-final 2 games to 0
2004-2005 Out of Playoffs
2005-2006 Out of Playoffs
2006-2007 Lost to Ottawa Gee-Gees in quarter-final 2 games to 0
2007-2008 Gained first round bye
 Lost to McGill Redmen in semi-final 2 games to 0
2008-2009 Did Not Qualify for Playoffs
2009-2010 Lost to Carleton in OUA First Round 2 games to 1
2010-2011 Lost to Nipissing in OUA First Round 2 games to 0
2013-2014 Lost to Carleton in OUA East Semi-Final 2 games to 1
2014-2015 Lost to McGill in OUA East Semi-Final 2 games to 0
2015-2016 Lost to UOIT in OUA First Round 2 games to 1
2016-2017 Lost to York in OUA Final
2017-2018 Lost to Concordia in OUA East Semi-Final 2 games to 1
2018-2019 Defeated Concordia 2-0
                Defeated Ottawa 2-1
                Defeated Carleton 2-0
                Defeated Guelph 4-1 (Won OUA Championship)
                Lost to St. FX X-Men 5-3 (USports Quarterfinals)

Women's
The Queen's Women's Hockey program captured their first OUA Championship in 2011. They went on to win it again in 2013.The program hosted the CIS Championship in 2017.

Rowing 
The Queen's Gaels Rowing program is one of the leading programs in the province of Ontario. Their last team OUA Championship was won by the Women's program in 2012. The Women's rowing program also won the Championship in 2010.

Most recently, Gavin Stone was named OUA Rower of the Year in 2021, also winning the award in 2018. Gavin participated in the Tokyo 2020 Olympic Games as a member of the Coxless Four team.

Other OUA Rowers of the Year from Queen's include: Alex Bernst (2017), Louise Munro (2017), Matthew Christie (2013).

Rugby

Men's
The men's rugby team is regarded as one of the most successful rugby programs in Canada, and has won the OUA a record 23 times. Their home games are played on Nixon Field, at the heart of Queen's University campus, and crowds often top 2,000 spectators.

Most recently, the team was won the OUA Championship in 2009, 2012, 2013, 2014, 2015, 2017, 2018 and 2019. Other dynasties include the late 80s.

The team is currently coached by Dave Butcher, who took over from Gary Gilks and Peter Huigenbos in 2017.

Nationally capped players that have come through the program are current national captain, Lucas Rumball, Alistair Clark, Sean Duke, Dan Moor, Kainoa Lloyd and Matt Beukeboom.

Men's Rugby is not a U SPORTS designated sport, therefore they compete in a similar non-sanctioned format called the Canadian University Men's Rugby Championship (CUMRC).

Women's

The women's rugby program holds a very similar regard in the U SPORTS Women's rugby scene, most notably winning the 2021 U SPORTS National Championship on home soil at Nixon Field.

The program has developed numerous national team athletes including Sophie de Goede, Chloe Daniels, McKinley Hunt and many more.

In OUA competition, the program has won the OUA Championship twice; in 2013 and 2019.

Soccer
Men's

The Queen's Gaels Men's Soccer program had their most successful season in 2012-13, making their way into the OUA Final Four, placing fourth overall.

Women's 
The women's soccer team captured gold at the CIS national championship in 2010. They beat rival Wilfrid Laurier 1-0 in the CIS final revenging its loss in the OUA final one-week earlier. Striker Jacqueline Tessier led the CIS in scoring during the regular season, tallying 18 goals in 16 games.

In 2006, earned silver medals in the CIS national championships, thanks largely to star striker Eilish McConville. McConville led all CIS players with 22 goals during the regular season, and was named the CIS Player of the year as a result.

Volleyball 
Men's

The Queen's Men's Volleyball program is a real powerhouse in the OUA and U SPORTS ranks. The team won the nine OUA Championships, most recently in back-to-back years (2018-19, 2019-20). Their other provincial titles came in 1971-72, 1999-00, 2001-02, 2005-06, 2006-07, 2011-12).

Women's

The Queen's Women's Volleyball team won their only OUA Championship in 2011-12 but continue to be a strong program in the OUA.

Most recently, Arielle Palermo and Caroline Livingston of the Gaels have represented Canada on the Women's National team in the Volleyball Nations League.

Varsity Clubs - Notes and Results 
Queen's Athletics & Recreation has almost 30 varsity clubs within their sport model. These include: Artistic Swimming (M/W), Baseball (M), Cheerleading (M/W), Curling (M/W), Cycling (M/W), Fastpitch (W), Fencing (M/W), Field Hockey (W), Figure Skating (M/W), Golf (M/W), Lacrosse (M/W), Nordic Skiing (M/W), Rugby Club (M), Squash (M/W), Sailing (M/W), Swimming (M/W), Track & Field (M/W), Triathlon (M/W), Ultimate (M/W), Water Polo (M/W) and Wrestling (M/W).

Baseball
The Queen's Baseball team came back and finally won their first OUA championship in 2022, winning a thriller over the University of Toronto Varsity Blues.

Curling
The men's curling team, in 2010, earned the gold medal at the CIS national championship in Edmonton, Alberta.  The team led by First Team All-Canadian Jonathan Beuk went 5-1 in Round Robin play before beating the Manitoba Bisons in the semi-final and the UPEI Panthers in the Championship.  The Gaels qualified for the 2011 World University Games in Erzurum, Turkey where they represented Canada. The team finished fifth after losing a tie-breaker match to the Czech Republic.

Track and field
Track and field is reported as the first sport at Queen's University. It began in 1873, as competitions held annually to celebrate the Universities inauguration on October 16 and included traditional Scottish competitions such as the caber toss. These competitions remained major university events into the early 20th century.

When the CIAU (now U Sports) began, the Queen’s University Track and Field team was one of the only teams to participate in all three athletics sports – indoor track and field, outdoor track and field, and cross-country.

In 1963 Rolf Lund was named head coach of the team, marking a turning point in the team’s history. Through the late 1960s, 1970s and 1980s, the Queen’s track and field team saw many successful athletes. Some notable athletes include Olympian Sheridon Baptiste; Olympian Anne Marie Malone; Olympian Victor Gooding, current school 1500m record holder Bob McCormack; and past head coach and multiple CIS champion Melody Torcalacci.

Squash 
The Women's Squash program has created a real legacy within the Ontario University ranks, winning eight straight OUA titles and counting.

Awards and honors

Athletes of the Year
The annual Athletic Awards gala is known as the Colour Awards for Varsity Teams and Clubs.

For a full list of award winners, go to https://gogaelsgo.com/sports/2011/8/7/GEN_0807111523.aspx.

Mascot
Boo Hoo the Bear is the mascot of Queen's University. Boo Hoo wears a vest and tam o' shanter in the Royal Stewart tartan.

Originally, Boo Hoo was a real bear which was paraded around at football games and kept in the basement of Grant Hall. The first bear was a pet of Bill Hughes who brought him to Queen's when he was hired as a boxing trainer. Music has been composed that was inspired by the Boo Hoo dynasty — "Boo-Hoo's march for piano", "Boo Hoo's Queen's Dominion Victory March" (1922) and "The Mascot: Boo Hoo's March to Queen's Rugby Team" — by Oscar Telgmann in Toronto in the 1920s.

This was the first of a succession of five bears who lived at the stadium until the 1950s. The story of each bear is still unknown, though no bear reached full size. The Queen's student government, the Alma Mater Society, was in charge of bears three and four. 

The mascot was revived in its present form in the 1980s by the Queen's Bands Cheerleaders and is currently in his eighth incarnation, giving him the full title of "King Boo Hoo the Eighth". He is seen often around the Queen's campus, at the Queen's Gaels Canadian football games, frosh week and homecoming, and has been on the cover of several issues of Golden Words.

References

External links

 Queen's Gaels
 Explanation of the Term at the Queen's Website

 
U Sports teams
Sport in Kingston, Ontario
Golden Gaels
Canadian Gaelic
Rugby union teams in Ontario